In set theory, a mathematical discipline, a reflecting cardinal is  a cardinal number κ for which there is a normal ideal I on κ such that for every X∈I+, the set of α∈κ for which X reflects at α is in I+. (A stationary subset S  of κ is said to reflect at α<κ if S∩α is stationary in α.)

Every weakly compact cardinal is a reflecting cardinal, and is also a limit of reflecting cardinals.
The consistency strength of an inaccessible reflecting cardinal is strictly greater than a greatly Mahlo cardinal, where a cardinal κ is called greatly Mahlo if it is κ+-Mahlo . An inaccessible reflecting cardinal is not in general Mahlo however, see https://mathoverflow.net/q/212597.

See also
 List of large cardinal properties

References
 

Large cardinals